Bishop Zdenko Ivan Križić, O.C.D. (born 2 February 1953) is a Croatian Roman Catholic prelate who currently serves as the second Diocesan Bishop of the Roman Catholic Diocese of Gospić-Senj since 4 April 2016.

Education
Bishop Križić was born into a Bosnian Croat Roman Catholic family near Doboj in the Bosnia and was baptized with a name Ivan. 

After graduation of the secondary school of the Conventual Franciscans in Zagreb, he joined a mendicant order of the Discalced Carmelites and after the novitiate consequently studied the philosophy in Florence, Italy and theology in the Pontifical Institute of Spirituality Teresianum in Rome. He made a profession on 27 July 1970 and a solemn profession on 16 July 1976 in Zagreb, and was ordained as priest on 26 June 1977, after completed his philosophical and theological studies. Fr. Križić continued his studies of spirituality at the Teresianum, where he received his master's degree in 1978.

Pastoral and educational work
Fr. Zdenko held numerous positions: Prefect of the Minor Seminary of the Carmelite Fathers in Zagreb (1978–1984); first adviser to the Carmelite Commissariat (1984–1990); prior of the monastery in Remete-Zagreb (1984–1990); external professor at the Institute for Christian Spirituality in Zagreb (1984–2012); Provincial of the Croatian Carmelite Province of Saint Joseph the Father (1990–1996); Vicar of the Province (1996-2002); prior of the monastery in Remete, Zagreb (1996–1997); prior of the newly founded monastery in Krk (1997–2002); master of novices (1997–1999); Provincial of the Croatian Carmelite Province (2002–2003); Vicar General of the Order of Carmel (2003–2009); prior of the monastery in Krk and provincial advisor (2011–2012); since 2012 he has been the rector of the Pontifical Institute of Spirituality Teresianum in Rome until his election as bishop.

Prelate
On 4 April 2016 he was appointed by Pope Francis as the second Diocesan Bishop of the Diocese of Gospić-Senj. On 25 May 2016 he was consecrated as bishop by Cardinal Josip Bozanić and other prelates of the Roman Catholic Church in the Cathedral of the Annunciation in Gospić.

References

External links

1953 births
Living people
People from Doboj
Croats of Bosnia and Herzegovina
Teresianum alumni
Discalced Carmelite bishops
21st-century Roman Catholic bishops in Croatia
Bishops appointed by Pope Francis